Antonia Barber (real name Barbara Anthony; 10 December 1932 - 4 April 2019), was an English author of books for children and adults. Barber resided in Kent and Mousehole, Cornwall. Her book The Mousehole Cat was adapted as an animated film and is being adapted as a stage musical. She graduated from University College London. The younger sister of fellow author Pamela Oldfield, Barber was married to a structural engineer.

Selected works
 The Affair of the Rockerbye Baby (1966)
 The Ghosts (1969; filmed as The Amazing Mr Blunden, 1972)
 The Ring in the Rough Stuff (1983)
 The Enchanter's Daughter (1987) 
 Satchelmouse and the Doll's House (1987)
 The Mousehole Cat (1990)
 Catkin (1994)
 Hidden Tales from Eastern Europe
 Dancing Shoes
 Dancing Shoes, Dance to the Rescue

Awards and recognition
 The Ghosts (1969)
 Shortlisted for the Carnegie Medal

 The Ring in the Rough Stuff (1983)
 Shortlisted for the Carnegie Medal

 The Mousehole Cat (1990)
 Nestle Smarties Book Prize children's choice 
 British Book Award 

 Three illustrators have earned some recognition by the British Library Association for their collaborations with Barber.
 Errol Le Cain, The Enchanter's Daughter, a commended runner up for the 1987 Greenaway Medal
 Nicola Bayley, The Mousehole Cat, a commended runner up for the 1990 Greenaway
 P. J. Lynch, Catkin, on the shortlist for the 1994 Greenaway

 The Kate Greenaway Medal recognises the year's best children's book illustration (in that time, by a British subject).

References

External links

Author page at Walker Books

1932 births
2019 deaths
Alumni of University College London
Writers from Cornwall
English children's writers
English women writers